Acalyptus is a genus of true weevils in the family of beetles known as Curculionidae. There is at least one described species in Acalyptus, A. carpini.

References

Further reading

External links

 

Curculioninae
Articles created by Qbugbot